The following were mayors of Preston, Lancashire, England:

1526-27: James Walton, MP for Preston, 1529
1528-31: Christopher Haydock, MP for Preston, 1529
1532-33: James Walton
1533-34: James Walton
1535 William Wall
1545 Henry Walls MP for Preston, (1545) 
1546-46: James Walton
1566 Evan Wall
1696 John Atherton
1700 George Addison
1701-02 Josias Gregson 
1702 Geoffrey Rishton 
1703 William Lemon
1704 John Atherton
1705 Thomas Winckley 
1706 John Chorley
1707 Roger Sudell
1708 George Addison
1709 John Loxham
1710 George Lamplugh
1711 William Graddwell (Gladwell)
1712 Ralph Assheton
1713 Edmund Assheton
1714 Lawrence Wall
1715 William Lemon
1716 Robert Chaddocks
1717 Joseph Curtis
1718 Richard Casson
1719 George Lamplugh
1720 William Graddwell
1721-22 Edmund Assheton
1722 Lawrence Wall
1723 John Thornton
1724 John Clayton
1725 Thomas Garlicke
1726 John Myers
1727 Richard Addison
1728 Joseph Curtis
1729 Edmund Ashton (Assheton)
1730 Lawrence Wall
1731 Sir Edward Stanley, bart.
1732: William Atherton (1703-1745)
1738: William Atherton (1703-1745)
1761-62: Robert Townley Parker, MP for Preston, 1837 and 1852
1868-69: John James Myres, founder of Myres and Newton
1873-74: John James Myres
1802–03: Samuel Horrocks, MP for Preston, 1804 
1901-02: Frederick Stanley, 16th Earl of Derby, MP for Preston, 1865 and Governor-General of Canada
1902-03: Alderman E. Greenwood (Conservative)
1903-04 James Craven
1913-19: Harry Cartmell
1934-35: Robert C. Handley
1946-47: William Beckett
1963-64: Cyril Evan Molyneux
1964-65: Joseph Lund
1965-66: William Beckett
1966-67: Joseph Holden
1982-83: Joseph Saul Pownall
1991-92: Mary Rawcliffe

21st century
Source: Preston City Council
2000-01 Joseph Hood 
2001-02 Alan Lester Hackett 
2002-03 Jonathan Saksena 
2003-04 Neil Cartwright 
2004-05 Patricia Woods 
2005-06 Bhikhu Patel 
2006-07 William Tyson 
2007-08 Christine Abram 
2008-09 John Swindells 
2009-10 Keith Sedgewick 
2010-11 Albert Richardson 
2011-12 Bobby Cartwright
2012-13 Carl Crompton
2013-14 Veronica Afrin
2014-15 Nicholas Pomfret
2015-16 Margaret MacManus
2016-17 John Collins
2017-18 Brian Rollo
2018-19 Trevor Hart
2019-21 David Borrow
2021-22 Javed Iqbal JP
2022-23 Neil Darby

References

Preston
Lancashire-related lists